GaymerX is an American 501c3 non-profit dedicated to celebrating and supporting LGBTQ+ people and culture in the world of gaming, with a focus on video games. GaymerX puts on a fan-facing convention with LGBT-oriented gaming and geek culture, or gaymer, with panels primarily focused on LGBT issues and debates in the gaming industry.

History 
GaymerX was founded in August 2013 by Matt Conn and Toni Rocca as part of MidBoss.

The goal was to establish a space for those who felt larger gaming conventions like E3 were unwelcoming places for LGBT gamers. The first instance of GaymerX was financed through a crowdfunding campaign on Kickstarter, and occurred on August 3 and 4, 2013 in San Francisco, CA. Organizers have said the event is about uniting gay gamers, not creating a division among gamers, as they want to create a "safe place" for LGBT gamers.

The planned convention began with significant news coverage of its initial Kickstarter launch, but the event achieved more widespread attention after the anti-gay Westboro Baptist Church, known widely as a hate group that pickets espousing homophobic statements, announced that they would protest the convention.

GaymerX began with a Kickstarter project launched on August 1, 2012, which was covered by sites such as Examiner and GamePolitics.com. The convention raised over $14,000 in its first two days, exceeded its goal of $25,000 as early as August 6, and ended with over $90,000. Throughout the fundraising campaign, organizers added new support levels, in addition to existing support levels that include admission to the event and voice acting from Ellen McLain. At a session during the convention, McLain took part as assistant to a marriage proposal to help an attendee propose to his boyfriend by voicing a version of the song Still Alive with reworked lyrics.
GaymerX2 was held at the InterContinental Hotel between July 11–13, 2014 in downtown San Francisco. It featured Darren Young, the first openly gay wrestler in the WWE, who revealed that he would be a playable character in the upcoming WWE 2K15.

In July 2017 Gaymerx officially incorporated as a 501c3 non profit. Separating it from MidBoss. At this time a board of directors was formed consisting of consists of Raymond Lancione, Tanya DePass, Brian Kunde, Soraya Een Hajji, Steven Harmon, and Eugenio Vargas. and Matt Conn was replaced by Toni Rocca as executive director.

In 2018 Matt Conn was accused of labor rights violations. While Matt was had not been affiliated with GaymerX since the organization split from Midboss the previous year, he was the head of MidBoss, which had been a major sponsor of past events. In response GaymerX announced they were cutting all ties with MidBoss, and would no longer allow them to sponsor future events. Although shortly afterwards Matt resigned from MidBoss, the two organizations have had not had any further relationship.

In April 2018 GaymerX named a new Executive Director: Katie Kaitchuck (Replacing Toni) Since her appointment of the organization they have launched a new scholarship program to help LGBT developers get into the industry.

In January GaymerX East 2019 was announced planned to take place on April 27 & 28 at the Microsoft Conference Center in Times Square. On February 14, 2019, it was announced that GaymerX East 2019 had been cancelled.

Events

GXDev: Everyone Creates
GXDev: Everyone Creates, was a game jam and hackathon that happened over January 9 through 11th in 2015 and featured over 40 developers who produced over 10 games featuring queer content and themes, including one about "dating butts", and one about polyamory.

See also
 Flame Con, an LGBTQ-focused multi-genre entertainment and comic convention
 Gaylaxicon, a national LGBTQ+ science-fiction, fantasy, horror, comics and games convention
 ClexaCon, an entertainment convention focused on LGBTQ women
 LGBT culture
 Video games in the United States

References

External links 
 
 GaymerX on Twitter

Annual events in California
Gaming conventions
Kickstarter projects
LGBT and video games
LGBT culture in San Francisco
LGBT events in the United States
Recurring events established in 2013
San Francisco Bay Area conventions
Video gaming in the United States
2013 establishments in California